Trond Einar Elden (born 21 February 1970) is a Norwegian former Nordic combined skier who represented Namdalseid I.L. in Trondheim. He competed at three Winter Olympics.

At the 1989 FIS Nordic World Ski Championships in Lahti, he became the youngest world champion ever, fifteen days after his nineteenth birthday. At Falun in 1993, he won a bronze medal in the 15 km individual event. Additionally, Elden won two medals in the 3 × 10 km team event at the Nordic skiing world championships with a gold in 1989 and a silver in 1993. Elden also won the Nordic combined event twice at the Holmenkollen ski festival (1989, 1991).

In 1991, Elden received the Holmenkollen medal (which he shared with Vegard Ulvang, Ernst Vettori, and Jens Weißflog). He would also win silver in the 3 × 10 km team event at the 1992 Winter Olympics in Albertville.

Elden was relatively strong in cross-country skiing as well, spending his final years of competition as a ski sprinter. He later coached the American national skiing team. Elden received the Egebergs Ærespris in 2004. He is the brother of the Nordic combined skier Bård Jørgen Elden.

Nordic combined wins in World Cup

Cross-country skiing results
All results are sourced from the International Ski Federation (FIS).

Olympic Games

World Championships

World Cup

Season standings

Individual podiums

 2 podiums

References

External links

Holmenkollen medalists - click Holmenkollmedaljen for downloadable pdf file 
Holmenkollen winners since 1892 - click Vinnere for downloadable pdf file 

1970 births
Living people
Nordic combined skiers at the 1992 Winter Olympics
Nordic combined skiers at the 1994 Winter Olympics
Holmenkollen medalists
Holmenkollen Ski Festival winners
Norwegian male Nordic combined skiers
Norwegian male cross-country skiers
Olympic Nordic combined skiers of Norway
Olympic medalists in Nordic combined
FIS Nordic World Ski Championships medalists in Nordic combined
Medalists at the 1992 Winter Olympics
Olympic silver medalists for Norway
Olympic cross-country skiers of Norway
Cross-country skiers at the 2002 Winter Olympics